The 2008–09 Süper Lig (also known as Turkcell Super League due to sponsoring reasons) was the fifty-first season since its establishment. It began on 22 August 2008 and ended on 31 May 2009. Galatasaray were the defending champions.

Beşiktaş clinched the championship after winning at Denizlispor on the last matchday. The latter barely avoided relegation after finishing in a three-way tie on points with Gençlerbirliği and Konyaspor. Head-to-head comparison between those three teams eventually resulted in the demotion of Konyaspor, who joined Kocaelispor and Hacettepe on their way to the second-level First League.

Fenerbahçe and Galatasaray had to settle for fourth and fifth place, respectively, after Sivasspor came in as runners-up and Trabzonspor finished third. The final positions for the three Istanbul clubs marked the first time since the 1980–81 season that only one of them was able to finish among the top three teams in Turkish football.

Promotion and relegation from 2007–08
Çaykur Rizespor, Manisaspor and Kasımpaşa were relegated at the end of the 2007–08 season after finishing on the bottom three places of the standings. They were replaced by TFF First League champions Kocaelispor, runners-up Antalyaspor and play-off winners Eskişehirspor.

Team overview

Notes
 Kayserispor played their 2008 home matches at Kayseri Atatürk Stadium. Before moving to their current stadium in March 2009, the team played several home matches at 5 Ocak Stadium in Adana.

Managerial changes

Standings

Positions by round

Results

Top goalscorers
Source: tff.org

Hat-tricks

Transfers

See also
 2008–09 Türkiye Kupası
 2008–09 TFF First League
 2008–09 TFF Third League

References

Süper Lig seasons
Turkey
1